No Vacancy is a 1999 American independent comedy film written and directed by Marius Balchunas in his directorial debut.

Plot
The film is about the various people who inhabit the seedy Pink Motel in Los Angeles. Two men wake up with hookers, then proceed to accost a beauty-obsessed woman (Lolita Davidovich); the Latino motel owner (Joaquim de Almeida) is angered after finding his daughter (Patricia Velasquez) wants to marry a white man; a young woman (Christina Ricci) wakes up to find a stranger (Timothy Olyphant) in her bed.

Cast
 Christina Ricci as Lilian
 Timothy Olyphant as Luke
 Robert Wagner as Mr. Tangerine
 Lolita Davidovich as Constance
 Gabriel Mann as Michael
 Ryan Bollman as Pete
 Joaquim De Almeida as Reynaldo
 Patricia Velasquez as Ramona
 Graham Beckel as "Do It Again" Guy
 Rhona Bennett  as Penelope
 Olek Krupa as Leonard
 Tracy Tutor as Prudence

References

External links 

1999 films
1999 comedy films
American comedy films
Films scored by Alex Wurman
Films set in motels
1999 directorial debut films
1990s English-language films
1990s American films